The Museu de la Música de Barcelona (English: Music Museum of Barcelona) is a museum in Barcelona, Spain that houses a collection of musical instruments from around the world as well as biographical documents, from ancient civilisations to new technologies from the 21st century. The museum collection comprises 2000 musical instruments, 500 of which are on display, including one of the best guitar collections of the world. The museum covers historical, conservational and research aspects and promotes the city’s musical heritage.

The Museu de la Música is administered by the City Council. Since 2007 its headquarters are found on the second floor of the L'Auditori de Barcelona in the Fort Pienc neighbourhood.

See also 
 List of music museums

References

External links 
 Music Museum of Barcelona: official website
 Museum über die Geschichte der Musik (german)

Museums in Barcelona
Music museums
Music organisations based in Spain